Belmont Red is a breed of beef cattle developed by the Commonwealth Scientific and Industrial Research Organisation (CSIRO) during 1954 in response to the need in the Australian Tropics for cattle which would improve the fertility of Bos indicus cattle.  The breed was conceived at Belmont Research Station near Rockhampton, Queensland as a composite from several Bos taurus breeds: Africander (African Sanga), Hereford and Shorthorn. The breed was released to Australian breeders by the CSIRO in 1969.

Selected traits were higher fertility, high resistance to ticks, superior heat tolerance, good growth, better meat quality, a placid temperament, and feed efficiency on grass or in the feedlot.

Rigid selection for these traits of economical importance has resulted in the evolution of well adapted cattle to both a tropical and temperate environment.

Large commercial herds running on native pastures in both Queensland and the Northern Territory have calving rates above 90% achieved in large breeder groups containing 5,000 head.

Belmont Reds have achieved many wins and placings in Carcass competitions.

In 2021, the Belmont Red Breed Society bemoaned the fact that the breed was not yet represented in the series of Big Bulls scattered throughout the city of Rockhampton, near where the breed was developed. President of the Belmont Red Breed Society, Jeanne Seifert said a statue of a Belmont Red bull would not only be a good focal point for visitors to the city but also a tribute to the contribution which had been made by scientists and the CSIRO.  Her father was Dr George Seifert, a principal scientist based at the Belmont Research Station credited with helping develop the breed composition.

References

Stephens, M (et al.), Handbook of Australian Livestock, Australian Meat & Livestock Export Corporation, 2000 (4th ed),

External links
Belmont Australia website

Cattle breeds
Cattle breeds originating in Australia